The Embassy of Japan in Moscow is the chief diplomatic mission of Japan in the Russian Federation. It is located at 27 Grokholsky Lane in the Krasnoselsky District of Moscow.

The Ambassador is Toyohisa Kozuki.

See also 
 Japan–Russia relations
 Diplomatic missions in Russia

References

External links 
  Embassy of Japan in Moscow

Japan–Russia relations
Japan–Soviet Union relations
Japan
Moscow
Government agencies established in 1956